Miles is a Bangladeshi rock band formed in Dhaka in 1 August 1979. They have released ten studio albums and three compilations.

They released their self titled debut studio album Miles in 1982, which contained English numbers. They released their second album A Step Farther in 1986. After four years, they released their third studio and first Bengali album Protisruti (Promise) in 1991.

History
The band formed in 1979 by Farid Rashid, Kamal Mainuddin, Larry Burnaby, Ishtiaq, Musa, Robin and Happy Akhand.

Their first album, Miles, was released in 1982, including five original songs and seven cover songs. Their second album, A Step Farther was released in 1986 and it consisted of 7 original and 5 cover songs. Their first Bengali album, Protisruti, was released in 1991. It included 12 original Bengali songs. Their second Bengali album, Prottasha, was released in 1993. In 1994, the first CD of the band was released as Best of Miles.

The fourth Bengali album, Probaho, was produced in 1999.

In 2011, Grameenphone announced that it would release their album Proticchobi. The album was released in 2015.

Miles was invited to play at a 2016 concert in Kolkata celebrating India's Independence Day. Fossils, an Indian hard rock band which was also scheduled to perform, accused Miles of posting anti-Indian messages on social media during the Cricket World Cup. Lead singer and bassist Shafin Ahmed responded that his posts were not anti-Indian, were his personal beliefs as a patriotic Bangladeshi, and did not represent the views of the band. Organizers disinvited both bands.

Shafin Ahmed left the band, for the second time, at the end of 2017. He rejoined in August 2018 after resolving differences with other members. He announced at the end of 2021 that he will be leaving the band for the third and final time.

Concerts

From 1979 to 1982, Miles played at the Chambeeli Super Club at the Hotel Intercontinental in Dhaka five nights a week. They went on to perform on Bangladesh Television. In 1982, Miles made their first appearance in public concert at Shilpakala Academy Auditorium in Dhaka.

In 1991, they performed their first concert outside Bangladesh, in Bangalore. In 1992, Miles performed in the very first BAMBA concert. They signed a lucrative sponsor deal with Pepsi in 1995 where exclusive concerts were held in Bangladesh. In 1996 and 1998 they went back to India to perform in Kolkata. In 1996 they did a major tour in the US and Canada over two months. They performed in New York City, Dallas, Oklahoma City, Chicago, Miami and Montreal.

In 1999, they performed in a large concert at Chittagong stadium with over 30,000 attending. Miles toured Australia and Italy in 2008. They also went to cities of the UAE.

In 2010, Miles performed mainly in stadium concerts across the country, in cities including Rangpur, Comilla, Mymensingh, Khulna, Rajshahi, Chittagong and Dhaka.

In 2012, Miles started their 32-year anniversary tour by performing in cities of United States including Atlanta, Houston, Los Angeles, New York, San Jose, and Seattle.

In 2019, Miles celebrated their 40 years by touring and performing in 17 cities in America (New Jersey, Virginia, Baltimore, Michigan, Los Angeles, New York, Atlantic City, Phoenix, San Jose and Tampa), 7 cities in Canada (Toronto, Vancouver, Calgary, Winnipeg, Edmonton, Ottawa and Montreal) and 3 cities in Australia (Sydney, Brisbane and Melbourne). After returning back to their home country Bangladesh, Miles toured and performed in 4 cities (Chittagong, Khulna, Rajshahi and Sylhet) and later ended the whole 40 years celebration by performing at the Bashundhara International Convention Centre in Dhaka with Dalchhut, Feedback, Souls, Vikings and Warfaze performing as guests.

Members
Present members
 Hamin Ahmed – vocals, lead guitars 
 Manam Ahmed - keyboards 
 Syed Ziaur Rahman Turjo – drums 
 Iqbal Asif Jewel – lead guitars 

Past members
 Happy Akhand – keyboards, vocals 
 Farid Rashid – lead vocals, bass guitars 
 Kamal Mainuddin - drums 
 Larry Burnaby - lead guitars 
 Ishtiaq - rhythm guitars 
 Musa - lead guitars 
 Shehedul Huda - drums 
 Robin - keyboards 
 Milton Akbar - drums 
 Mahbub Ur Rashid - drums 
 Khayem Ahmed - bass guitars 
 Faysal Ahmed Tanim - bass guitars 
 Shafin Ahmed - vocals, bass guitars

Discography

Studio albums

 First album : Miles (1982)

Their first album Miles was their English cover songs album in which there are songs from that time fully composed by the band itself. They had various English song numbers, they did not gain much popularity at the time as none of the record labels would produce cover songs at the time. It is a 45-minute audio cassette album released by Modhumita Music Industries and then was released in Spotify in 2019.

 Second album : A Step Farther (1986)
Their second album was in English and was completely written and composed by the band itself. Being the only band in Bangladesh to have English albums and were slowly becoming popular due to private concerts and people listening to famous English songs. It is a 41-minute audio cassette album released by Sargam.

 Third album : Protisruti (Promise) (1991)
Their third album Protisruti is their third album and their first Bengali album Miles has ever composed. A hit after its release, all the songs being 90s classics and very famous across the country. They are sung by the brother vocalists Shafin Ahmed and Hamin Ahmed. They got their first television appearance on Bangladesh Television. It is a 56-minute audio cassette album distributed by Dawn Music and was then released on online streaming platforms by Qinetic Music.

 Fourth album : Prottasha (Expectation) (1993)
Their fourth album Prottasha is their most successful album and was also acclaimed overseas. All the songs were a blockbuster hit at the time and the song's tune "Phiriye Dao" was copied in Bollywood in the movie Murder in 2004 by the composer Anu Malik. The song "Jaane Jana" had the exact same tune of "Phiriye Dao". The album is a 56-minute audio cassette album released by Sangeeta and released online by Qinetic Music.

 Fifth album : Prottoy (Belief) (1996)
Their fifth album Prottoy is their most known album with one of their greatest heavy rock and indie songs of Bangladesh. It is a 59-minute album distributed by D-Series as audio cassettes and then released online by Qinetic Music.

 Sixth album : Proyash (Attempt) (1997)
It was their first album to have only two songs in its audio cassette, Side-A having "Tomar Ashay" and Side-B having "Neel Noyon". It is a 15-minute single album distributed by Qinetic Music.

 Seventh album : Probaho (Flow) (2000)
It was Miles' seventh album which was their special edition 20 year anniversary of the band. It is a 60-minute 12 song album which was released as an audio cassette by Sangeeta and then released as CDs, then released to the online streaming platforms by Qinetic Music.

 Eighth album : Protiddhoni (Echoes) (2006)
The first album for Miles' where they had a music video album alongside their first audio CD album. Being a popular band, the music videos caught attention of the Miles fans and they all posted it on social media and on YouTube in 2007. It is a 61-minute 13-song album with Manam Ahmed and Iqbal Asif Jewel first time giving vocals in the audio CD album distributed by Sangeeta.

 Ninth album : Proticchobi (Reflections) (2015)
Their ninth album was their longest awaited album, Proticchobi album was released nine years after they had released their last album, Protiddhoni. It was distributed by Grameenphone with the association of Deadline Music Records. The same year, it was released in famous online streaming platforms. It is an 8-song 39-minute audio album distributed by Qinetic Music.

Extended Play
 First EP : Proborton (Induction) (2016)
It was named as "Proticchobi : Deluxe Edition"  and released in YouTube which consisted of three of the songs from the EP. But, they added an original English song of their own after almost 30 years and they released it on an internationally recognized platform Sony DADC as a CD, and later sold as an audio album in Amazon. It is a 4-song 22-minute EP distributed by Sony Music.

Compilation albums
 Best of Miles (মাইলসের সেরা) (1994)
 প্রিয়তমা (Darling) (?)
 ফিরিয়ে দাও (Give [it] Back) (2012)

References

External links 

 Miles - Official Facebook Page
 

1979 establishments in Bangladesh
Musical groups established in 1979
Bangladeshi rock music groups